Tabomeeres is a monotypic moth genus of the family Noctuidae described by Nye in 1975. Its only species, Tabomeeres dolera, was first described by Turner in 1939. It is found in Australia.

References

Acontiinae
Monotypic moth genera